Agnia pulchra is a species of beetle in the family Cerambycidae. It was described by Per Olof Christopher Aurivillius in 1891. It is known from the Philippines. It contains the variety Agnia pulchra var. sulphureomaculata.

References

Lamiini
Beetles described in 1891